Robert John Howe (born 22 December 1945) is an English former professional footballer who played as a left-back or midfielder.

Playing career
Howe played for West Ham United youth system before progressing through their ranks and appearing in the first team at the age of 21 in 1966. He played at Upton Park until 1971 when he switched to A.F.C. Bournemouth. He played there until his retirement from league football in 1973.

Howe came out of retirement in 1977 to become the player-coach of the Seattle Sounders in the NASL where he played until 1983.

Coaching career
After his playing days were over, Howe become the coach of the United States U-20 men's national soccer team at the 1993 FIFA World Youth Championship and later went on to become the coach of the Portland Timbers from 2001–05. Howe was also in charge of the "Education of Coaches " for the US Soccer Federation. He wrote the preface for " The official playing and coaching manual of the United States Soccer Federation". Howe also had a short stint with the Saint Kitts and Nevis national football team towards the end of 2012 in a consultancy role.

After managing the Portland Timbers, Howe became the Director of Coaching for Emerald City FC youth soccer club in Seattle, Washington. He has served in this role for 11 years. In January 2016, Howe was the 2016 recipient of the "Dr. Thomas Fleck, US Youth Soccer Excellence in Coaching" award.

Honours

As a player
West Ham
 FA Youth Cup: 1963
 Football League Cup runner-up: 1966

Seattle Sounders
 NASL National Conference: 1977
 NASL Western Division: 1980, 1982
 Trans-Atlantic Challenge Cup: 1981
 Europac Cup: 1982
 Soccer Bowl runner-up: 1977, 1982

As a manager
Portland Timbers
 Commissioner's Cup: 2004

References

External links
 Fansite for the West Ham United 1970-71 team
 Bobby Howe at Emerald City FC
 NASL stats

1945 births
Living people
English footballers
Association football fullbacks
Association football midfielders
AFC Bournemouth players
North American Soccer League (1968–1984) coaches
North American Soccer League (1968–1984) players
People from Chadwell St Mary
Seattle Sounders (1974–1983) players
West Ham United F.C. players
English football managers
Portland Timbers (USL) coaches
USL First Division coaches
Seattle Sounders (1974–1983) coaches
English expatriate footballers
English expatriate sportspeople in the United States
Expatriate soccer players in the United States